José Luiz Aguiar e Ramalho (born 3 June 1963) is a Brazilian handball player. He competed in the 1992 Summer Olympics.

References

1963 births
Living people
Handball players at the 1992 Summer Olympics
Brazilian male handball players
Olympic handball players of Brazil
Handball players from São Paulo
Pan American Games bronze medalists for Brazil
Pan American Games medalists in handball
Medalists at the 1987 Pan American Games
20th-century Brazilian people